Yagoub Murghani Mustafa (born 28 February 2000), is a South Sudanese footballer who plays as a forward for Bentleigh Greens.

Career

Club career

Mustafa started his career with Inglewood United.

International career

He made his debut for South Sudan national football team on 9 October 2019 in an AFCON qualifier against Seychelles.

References

External links

1998 births
Living people
People with acquired South Sudanese citizenship
South Sudanese footballers
South Sudan international footballers
Australian soccer players
Australian people of South Sudanese descent
Sportspeople of South Sudanese descent
South Sudanese emigrants to Australia
Association football forwards
Perth Glory FC players
Stirling Macedonia FC players
A-League Men players
National Premier Leagues players